Cachoeirinha is a municipality located in the Brazilian state of Tocantins. Its population was 2,284 (2020) and its area is 352 km².

References

Municipalities in Tocantins